Juan Moreira is a 1948 Argentine historical action film directed by Luis Moglia Barth and starring Floren Delbene, Dorita Ferreyro and Nedda Francy. The film is an adaptation of the 1879 novel Juan Moreira by Eduardo Gutiérrez, portraying the life of the nineteenth century guacho and outlaw Juan Moreira.

Cast
 Floren Delbene
 Dora Ferreyro
 Nedda Francy
 Fernando Ochoa
 Domingo Sapelli
 Enrique Zingoni
 Alfonso Pisano
 Enrique Chaico
 Pascual Nacaratti
 Luis Zaballa
 Juan Sarcione
 Cayetano Biondo
 Marino Seré
 Ana Gryn
 Nathán Pinzón
 Alberto Dalbes
 Néstor Feria
 Pablo Cumo

References

Bibliography 
 Goble, Alan. The Complete Index to Literary Sources in Film. Walter de Gruyter, 1999.

External links 

1948 films
Argentine historical action films
1940s historical action films
1940s Spanish-language films
Films directed by Luis Moglia Barth
Films set in the 19th century
Films set in Argentina
Films based on Argentine novels
Films scored by Alejandro Gutiérrez del Barrio
Argentine black-and-white films
1940s Argentine films